Ana Beatriz Silva Correa (born 7 February 1992) is a Brazilian volleyball player. With her club SESI-SP she competed at the 2014 FIVB Volleyball Women's Club World Championship.

Career
Correa won the 2017 FIVB World Grand Prix gold medal and the Best Middle Blocker individual award.

Awards

Individuals
 2009 FIVB U18 World Championship – "Best Blocker"
 2017 FIVB World Grand Prix – "Best Middle Blocker"
 2017–18 Brazilian Superliga – "Best Blocker"
 2019 FIVB Nations League – "Best Middle Blocker"
 2019 South American Championship – "Best Middle Blocker"

Clubs
 2008–09 Brazilian Superliga –  Runner-up, with Finasa/Osasco
2011–12 Brazilian Superliga –  Champion, with Sollys Nestlé/Osasco
2013–14 Brazilian Superliga –  Runner-up, with Sesi-SP
2014–15 Brazilian Superliga –  Bronze medal, with Molico Nestlé/Osasco
2016–17 Brazilian Superliga –  Runner-up, with Vôlei Nestlé/Osasco
2020–21 Brazilian Superliga –  Bronze medal, with Osasco/São Cristóvão Saúde
2009 South American Club Championship –  Champion, with Finasa/Osasco
2011 South American Club Championship –  Champion, with Sollys Nestlé/Osasco
 2014 South American Club Championship –  Champion, with Sesi-SP
 2011 FIVB Club World Championship –  Bronze medal, with Sollys Nestlé/Osasco
 2014 FIVB Club World Championship –  Bronze medal, with Sesi-SP

References

External links
 profile at FIVB.org

1992 births
Living people
Brazilian women's volleyball players
Place of birth missing (living people)
Middle blockers
Volleyball players at the 2020 Summer Olympics
Olympic volleyball players of Brazil
Medalists at the 2020 Summer Olympics
Olympic medalists in volleyball
Olympic silver medalists for Brazil
Sportspeople from São Paulo (state)